Yuryuzan (Yürüźän) is a rural locality (a village) in Karaidelsky District of the Republic of Bashkortostan.

References

Rural localities in Karaidelsky District